The 1978–79 New Jersey Nets season was the Nets' third season in the NBA.

Draft picks

Roster

Regular season

Season standings

Record vs. opponents

Playoffs

|- align="center" bgcolor="#ffcccc"
| 1
| April 11
| @ Philadelphia
| L 114–122
| John Williamson (38)
| George Johnson (12)
| Eddie Jordan (9)
| Spectrum8,846
| 0–1
|- align="center" bgcolor="#ffcccc"
| 2
| April 13
| Philadelphia
| L 101–111
| Bernard King (27)
| van Breda Kolff, Johnson (13)
| Eddie Jordan (8)
| Rutgers Athletic Center9,126
| 0–2
|-

References

New Jersey Nets season
New Jersey Nets seasons
New Jersey Nets
New Jersey Nets
Piscataway, New Jersey